Underhill is a surname. Notable people with the surname include:

Adelaide Underhill (1860-1936), American librarian
Andrew Underhill (1749-1794), American silversmith
Barbara Underhill (born 1963), Canadian figure skater
Beth Underhill (born 1962), Canadian equestrian
Cave Underhill (1634 – c. 1710), English actor
Charles Edward Underhill (1845-1908) British surgeon
David Harris Underhill (1850–1936), American librarian and author
Edward Bean Underhill (1813–1901), English Baptist historian and biographer
Evelyn Underhill (1875–1941), British writer
Francis Underhill (1878-1943), English bishop, and cousin of Evelyn Underhill
Frank Underhill (1889–1971), Canadian historian and social activist
Fulke Underhill (1578–1599), the son of William Underhill II of Warwickshire, owner of New Place
George Lees Underhill (1813–1881), iron merchant who became thirteenth Mayor of Wolverhampton, 1861/62
Henry Underhill, (1855–1920), Oxford-based amateur scientist and photographer
Hercules Underhill (died 1650), who confirmed the sale of New Place to William Shakespeare
Hugh Underhill (1518–1593), English keeper of the wardrobe under Queen Elizabeth I
Captain John Underhill (1597–1672), English colonist and soldier in the Massachusetts Bay Colony
John Edward Underhill (1574–1608), English diplomat and exile
Irving Underhill (1872–1960), American commercial photographer
John Q. Underhill (1848–1907), American politician
John R. Underhill (born 1961), British geologist and football referee
Martyn Underhill (born 1958), Detective and Police and Crime Commissioner Dorset
Nicholas Underhill (born 1952), British lawyer and judge
Paco Underhill, American environmental psychologist
Reg Underhill (1914–1993), British Labour Party politician
Robert L. M. Underhill (1889–1983), American mountaineer
Roy Underhill (born 1950), American woodwright and host of the television series "The Woodwright's Shop"
Sam Underhill (born 1996), England Rugby player
Steven Underhill (born 1962), American photographer
Thomas Edgar Underhill (1854-1917) British physician
Wilbur Underhill, Jr. (1901–1934), American criminal, burglar, bank robber and Depression-era outlaw
William Wilson Underhill (1839–1935), American businessman, President of the United States Fire Insurance Company of New York
William Underhill (1933-2022), American sculptor

Fictional characters:
Ted Underhill, character in the films Fletch (film) and Fletch Lives
Susan Underhill (aka Betty Jo Bialosky), character from The Further Adventures of Nick Danger by Firesign Theater
Underhill (first name not mentioned), an FBI interrogator in John Grisham's novel The Partner
Frodo Baggins (aka Mr. Underhill), character from J. R. R. Tolkien's novel The Lord of the Rings

English-language surnames